Elections to Colchester Borough Council took place on 7 May 1998. This was on the same day as other local elections across the United Kingdom.

At the election, the Liberal Democrats lost control of the council to no overall control, with gains being made by both Labour and the Conservatives.

Summary

Ward results

Berechurch

Birch Messing Copford

Castle

Harbour

Lexden

No Independent Conservative candidate as previous (1.3%).

Mile End

New Town

Prettygate

Pyefleet

No Green candidate as previous (3.5%).

Shrub End

St. Andrew's

St. Anne's

St. John's

St. Mary's

Stanway

Tiptree

No Tiptree Residents candidate as previous (48.2%).

West Bergholt & Eight Ash Green

West Mersea

Winstree

Wivenhoe

By-elections

Tiptree

No Liberal Democrat candidate as previous (13.1%).

References

1998 English local elections
1998
1990s in Essex